Steve Lukert (December 10, 1947) is a former Democratic member of the Kansas House of Representatives, who represented the 62nd district.  He served from January 3, 2006 - 2011.  Lukert ran for re-election in 2010, but lost to Republican Randy Garber.

Lukert retired from teaching after 32 years, and has been a farmer for 40 years.  He and wife Linda have five children and 10 grandchildren.

Committee membership
 Taxation
 Agriculture and Natural Resources Budget
 Agriculture and Natural Resources
 Joint Committee on State-Tribal Relations

Major donors
The top 5 donors to Lukert's 2008 campaign were mostly from professional associations:
1. National Rifle Association 	$1,000
2. Kansas National Education Association 	$1,000 	
3. Kansas Contractors Association 	$1,000
4. Kansas Association of Realtors 	$900 	
5. Kansas Bankers Association 	$750

References

External links
 Kansas Legislature - Steve Lukert
 Project Vote Smart profile
 Kansas Votes profile
 Campaign contributions: 2004, 2006, 2008

Democratic Party members of the Kansas House of Representatives
Living people
1947 births
21st-century American politicians